The following is a partial list of the "D" codes for Medical Subject Headings (MeSH), as defined by the United States National Library of Medicine (NLM).

This list continues the information at List of MeSH codes (D23). Codes following these are found at List of MeSH codes (D26). For other MeSH codes, see List of MeSH codes.

The source for this content is the set of 2006 MeSH Trees from the NLM.

– biomedical and dental materials

– alloys
  – chromium alloys
  – vitallium
  – gold alloys
  – metal ceramic alloys
  – cermet cements
  – steel
  – stainless steel

– biocompatible materials
  – bone substitutes
  – coated materials, biocompatible
  – polydioxanone

– cariogenic agents

– cariostatic agents
  – acidulated phosphate fluoride
  – fluorides, topical
  – sodium fluoride
  – tin fluorides

– ceramics
  – dental porcelain

– dental materials
  – composite resins
  – bisphenol a-glycidyl methacrylate
  – compomers
  – dental alloys
  – chromium alloys
  – vitallium
  – dental amalgam
  – gold alloys
  – metal ceramic alloys
  – cermet cements
  – dental casting investment
  – dental cements
  – compomers
  – dentin-bonding agents
  – glass ionomer cements
  – cermet cements
  – polycarboxylate cement
  – resin cements
  – silicate cement
  – zinc oxide-eugenol cement
  – zinc phosphate cement
  – dental implants
  – dental impression materials
  – inlay casting wax
  – dental porcelain
  – pit and fissure sealants
  – root canal filling materials
  – gutta-percha

– dentifrices
  – denture cleansers
  – toothpaste

– membranes, artificial
  – liposomes
  – virosomes

– mouthwashes
  – saliva, artificial

– polymers
  – biopolymers
  – cellulose
  – cellophane
  – collodion
  – latex
  – lignin
  – rubber
  – colestipol
  – cyanoacrylates
  – enbucrilate
  – bucrylate
  – elastomers
  – polyurethanes
  – rubber
  – neoprene
  – silicone elastomers
  – fluorocarbon polymers
  – polytetrafluoroethylene
  – proplast
  – glass
  – hexadimethrine
  – latex
  – plastics
  – nylons
  – polyethylenes
  – polyethylene
  – polyethyleneimine
  – polypropylenes
  – polystyrenes
  – cholestyramine
  – polyurethanes
  – polyvinyls
  – polyvinyl alcohol
  – polyvinyl chloride
  – povidone
  – povidone-iodine
  – resins, synthetic
  – acrylic resins
  – polymethacrylic acids
  – methyl methacrylates
  – methyl methacrylate
  – polymethyl methacrylate
  – polyhydroxyethyl methacrylate
  – bone cements
  – composite resins
  – bisphenol a-glycidyl methacrylate
  – compomers
  – epoxy resins
  – resin cements
  – polyanetholesulfonate
  – polyesters
  – polydioxanone
  – Polyethylene terephthalates
  – polyglactin 910
  – polyglycolic acid
  – polyethylene glycols
  – cetomacrogol
  – hydrogel
  – nonoxynol
  – octoxynol
  – poloxalene
  – poloxamer
  – polyhydroxyethyl methacrylate
  – polysorbates
  – polygeline
  – polyphloretin phosphate
  – pyran copolymer
  – siloxanes
  – silicones
  – dimethylpolysiloxanes
  – simethicone
  – silicone elastomers
  – silicone gels
  – silicone oils

– root canal irrigants

– tissue adhesives
  – cyanoacrylates
  – enbucrilate
  – bucrylate

The list continues at List of MeSH codes (D26).

D25